Inappropriate Behavior is an upcoming American comedy-drama film written by Tony Spiridakis, directed by Tony Goldwyn and starring Bobby Cannavale and Robert De Niro.

Plot
Follows Max Brandel who blows up his successful career and marriage to become a somewhat less successful stand-up comic.

Cast
Bobby Cannavale as Max Brandel
Robert De Niro as Stan
Rose Byrne as Jenna
William Fitzgerald as Ezra
Vera Farmiga
Rainn Wilson
Whoopi Goldberg

Production
Filming occurred in Westwood, New Jersey and Jersey City in September 2022.

References

External links
 

Upcoming films
Films directed by Tony Goldwyn
Films shot in New Jersey